Joseph Gerard "Joe" Austen is a British artist, writer, producer and director from St Andrews, Scotland. 
Since 1976, a collection of his paintings have been on display in The Gallery of Champions within the Rusacks Hotel, St Andrews, Scotland.

For the 150th The Open Championship in St. Andrews in 2010, six of golf’s greatest champions were made Honorees of The Gallery of Champions when Joe Austen painted their portraits. Those portraits are now a permanent part of the gallery. Honorees included Tony Jacklin CBE, Arnold Palmer, Gary Player DMS; OIG, Sandy Lyle MBE and Roberto De Vicenzo. Roberto De Vicenzo attended the opening of the Gallery, along with Tony Jacklin CBE and Sandy Lyle MBE, and commented on the day, 'Joe Austen - your paintings will get you in to Heaven'.

In the Rusacks Hotel, St Andrews, Joe Austen’s painting collections are grouped into four separate categories; the Macdonald Collection, the Historical Collection, the Portraits of the Royal Captains and the most recently launched Tony Jacklin Ryder Cup Collection. The collections have been described as "portraits of golfing legends through the centuries", and the gallery was selected as the central location for the inaugural St Andrews Golf Festival in 2012 to showcase the strong links between St Andrews and golf.

Career

Golf Portraits 

Tony Jacklin CBE and Joe Austen collaborated in 2014 to create The Tony Jacklin Ryder Cup Collection; a new series of hand-painted oil portraits and limited edition prints of those portraits, which Austen has said will "commemorate The Ryder Cup at Gleneagles, Scotland in 2014"

Tony Jacklin CBE, a 'golfing icon' according to European Tour selected what he believed to be the 20 greatest players in the history of the Ryder Cup, and Joe Austen painted their portraits. Limited edition prints of The Tony Jacklin Ryder Cup Collection have been available online since the Ryder Cup 2014.

In 2011, Joe Austen's paintings were selected for the online launch of St Andrews Golf Art, a website which claims to offer "a unique selection of golf art from internationally-acclaimed contemporary artists, sculptors and illustrators"

In 2010, Joe Austen undertook a similar venture to The Tony Jacklin Ryder Cup Collection, in collaboration with Rolex. To commemorate the 150th year of The Open Championship, Rolex commissioned Joe Austen to paint a composite portrait of Jack Nicklaus, Arnold Palmer, and Gary Player DMS; OIG, from which 250 Limited Edition Prints were produced. All of the prints were signed by Arnold Palmer, Gary Player DMS; OIG and Joe Austen, and presented by Rolex as gifts to valued clients.

Joe Austen’s golf portraits are also exhibited in private and public collections throughout the world, including Arnold Palmer’s Bay Hills Golf Club, and The Concession Golf Club in Florida, co-designed by Tony Jacklin CBE and Jack Nicklaus. Within The Concession Golf Club, Austen's paintings of golfing champions and the spirit of the Ryder Cup, are displayed within the main hallways and are collectively titled The Concession Collection.

Portraits within the Gallery of Champions 

The majority of Joe Austen's paintings are on display within the Gallery of Champions, and the collections include the following paintings.
Allan Robertson
Arnold Palmer
Ben Hogan
Bobby Jones
Gary Player DMS; OIG
Gene Sarazen
Harry Vardon
Sir Henry Cotton MBE
Jack Nicklaus
James Braid
Johnny Miller
John Henry Taylor
Lee Trevino
Old Tom Morris
Peter Thomson AO CBE
Sam Snead
Sandy Lyle MBE
Seve Ballesteros
Tiger Woods
Tom Watson
Tom Weiskopf
Tony Jacklin CBE
Walter Hagen
Willie Auchterlonie
Young Tom Morris

Children's Television & Book Creations

The Magic House (TV series) 
Joe Austen created, wrote and illustrated 24 books in the bestselling Magic House series, which were published in 1985 by Richard Drew Publishing. He then went on to create and develop The Magic House television series for Scottish Television. It ran for three seasons from 1994 - 1996, and Joe Austen was involved in every aspect of its creation, acting as writer, illustrator, designer, and on-screen storyteller and presenter.

Subsequently, The Magic House was developed into a puppet Television Series for the ITV Network. As writer, designer and associate producer of The Magic House television series, Joe Austen wrote 55 scripts for three network series, and designed the puppets, sets, and cell-animated title sequences.

Austen then created The Magic Bank Club for TSB, based on The Magic House and aimed at promoting bank accounts for children.

Austen went on to create, write, illustrate and present Joe and Co, a Magic House spin-off, as a BBC television series.
Following this, Joe Austen was a writer, illustrator and co-presenter on the BBC Untied Shoelaces television series.

After The Magic House book series had been out of print for a number of years, a Facebook group was created by fans of The Magic House in June 2010, called Bring back the Magic House books (Joe Austen) in an effort to get them reprinted, highlighting the dedication of his readers. In July  2014, the Facebook page had gathered 261 fans.

Story Store 

The Story Store is a concept for television and publishing developed by Joe Austen. He went on to establish a new stop-frame model animation studio in central London in order to produce The Story Store television series for Carlton Television for the ITV Network in 1995. Austen developed the show and designed the puppets. He also directed the voice recordings of Alan Bennett, Rory Bremner and Stephen Fry. He went on to write and design four Story Store illustrated books.

Storyland Ltd. 
Joe Austen established Storyland Ltd in May 2001, a family entertainment company based in Dundee, with Lord Richard Attenborough as Company President.

In 2001, the company bought back ownership of more than 60 programmes and two dozen books created by Joe Austen for various broadcasters and publishers. These properties include 13 episodes of The Story Store, previously owned and aired by Carlton, and 55 episodes of The Magic House, which was developed for Scottish Television. Joe Austen said at the time that Storyland had paid a six-figure sum to bring these and other properties back into its ownership. They formed the core of a wide range of family entertainment that Storyland intended to market through television, satellite, cable, publishing and new media of the time, such as broadband.

During his time with Storyland, Austen produced a new Story Store Christmas Special for the ITV network in 2001, entitled Music & Moonlight, which aired on New Year's Day and featured impressionist Rory Bremner as the voice behind more than half-a-dozen characters. Storyland was subsequently publicly listed and became Storyland PLC, before being dissolved in March 2014.

References 

British artists
Year of birth missing (living people)
Living people